Christopher Hollyday is a jazz alto saxophonist.

Biography
Hollyday began playing the saxophone at the age of nine. He grew up in a musical family, and his father listened to a lot of bebop. He has an older brother, Richard; together, they had gigs locally in Worcester, Massachusetts in their teens. He was strongly influenced by Charlie Parker. He released albums on his own label, Jazzbeat – Treaty in 1985 and Oh, Brother! the following year.

In 1988 Hollyday led a band at the Village Vanguard. He was listed among the 'young lions' of jazz, including Roy Hargrove, Wynton Marsalis and Marcus Roberts, who were playing earlier styles of jazz and receiving a lot of media attention. Hollyday played in Maynard Ferguson's big band in 1989. His first recording as leader was Christopher Hollyday in 1989, for RCA / Novus. In the same year, he played in the UK. For On Course, Hollyday wrote eight of the 10 tracks.

His playing was praised for its technical facility, but criticized for its lack of expression. After four albums for RCA/Novus, Hollyday "was starting to develop his own voice when he was dropped from the label."

Hollyday moved to San Diego in 1996, "and became the band director at Valley Center High School". He shifted more to private tuition around 2013, which also gave him more time for his own playing again. He released a new album, Telepathy, in 2018.

Discography
An asterisk (*) after the year indicates that it is the year of release.

As leader

References

Jazz alto saxophonists